In Galois theory, a discipline within the field of abstract algebra, a resolvent for a permutation group G is a polynomial whose coefficients depend polynomially on the coefficients of a given polynomial p and has, roughly speaking, a rational root if and only if the Galois group of p is included in G. More exactly, if the Galois group is included in G, then the resolvent has a rational root, and the converse is true if the rational root is a simple root.
Resolvents were introduced by  Joseph Louis Lagrange and systematically used by Évariste Galois. Nowadays they are still a fundamental tool to compute Galois groups. The simplest examples of resolvents are
  where  is the discriminant, which is a resolvent for the alternating group. In the case of a cubic equation, this resolvent is sometimes called the quadratic resolvent; its roots appear explicitly in the formulas for the roots of a cubic equation. 
 The cubic resolvent of a quartic equation, which is a resolvent for the dihedral group of 8 elements.
 The Cayley resolvent is a resolvent for the maximal resoluble Galois group in degree five. It is a polynomial of degree 6.

These three resolvents have the property of being always separable, which means that, if they have a multiple root, then the polynomial p is not irreducible. It is not known if there is an always separable resolvent for every group of permutations.

For every equation the roots may be expressed in terms of radicals and of a root of a resolvent for a resoluble group, because, the Galois group of the equation over the field generated by this root is resoluble.

Definition 
Let  be a positive integer, which will be the degree of the equation that we will consider, and  an ordered list of indeterminates. This defines the generic polynomial of degree 

where  is the  th elementary symmetric polynomial.

The stabilizer of a given polynomial under this action is generally trivial, but some polynomials have a bigger stabilizer. For example, the stabilizer of an elementary symmetric polynomial is the whole group .

However, it may occur that the resulting polynomial is an invariant for a larger group. The monomial  gives the invariant .

If  is a resolvent invariant for a group  of index  inside , then its orbit under  has order . Let  be the elements of this orbit. Then the polynomial

is invariant under . Thus, when expanded, its coefficients are polynomials in the  that are invariant under the action of the symmetry group and thus may be expressed as polynomials in the elementary symmetric polynomials. Having the resolvent invariant as a root, it is called a resolvent (sometimes resolvent equation).

Consider now an irreducible polynomial

with coefficients in a given field  (typically the field of rationals) and roots  in an algebraically closed field extension.

Terminology
There are some variants in the terminology.
 Depending on the authors or on the context, resolvent may refer to resolvent invariant instead of to resolvent equation.
 A Galois resolvent  is a resolvent such that the resolvent invariant is linear in the roots.
 The  may refer to the linear polynomial  where  is a primitive nth root of unity. It is the resolvent invariant of a Galois resolvent for the identity group.
In this context, a usual resolvent is called an absolute resolvent.

Resolvent method

If a polynomial is separable and irreducible, then the corresponding Galois group is a transitive subgroup.

Transitive subgroups of  form a directed graph: one group can be a subgroup of several groups. One resolvent can tell if the Galois group of a polynomial is a (not necessarily proper) subgroup of given group. The resolvent method is just a systematic way to check groups one by one until only one group is possible. This does not mean that every group must be checked: every resolvent can cancel out many possible groups.

One way is to begin from maximal (transitive) subgroups until the right one is found and then continue with maximal subgroups of that.

References 

 
 

Group theory
Galois theory
Equations